Feels So Good is the second studio album by girl group Atomic Kitten and the first full original album featuring Jenny Frost. The style of the album is both comparable and different from the first album as it has upbeat dance songs, but consists mainly of pop ballads and midtempos. As with debut album Right Now, Orchestral Manoeuvres in the Dark members and Atomic Kitten founders, Andy McCluskey and Stuart Kershaw – who parted ways with the group during recording – made multiple songwriting contributions.

The album received mixed reviews, but fared well on the charts, reaching number one and selling 80,000 in its first week with the single "The Tide Is High" having been number one the week before, selling 145,000 copies. Atomic Kitten became only the second girl band to have the number-one single and album at the same time after the Spice Girls. Following the release of the single "The Last Goodbye"/"Be with You", the album climbed back to the top ten in for two weeks. The album was certified double platinum (862,000 sales) and the album was certified Platinum by the IFPI for selling more than one million copies in Europe. The album was further promoted with the simultaneous release of the book Atomic Kitten: So Good, So Far by Ian McLeish, in which the girl group gave an insight look into their early career.

Background
Following the success of their debut album Right Now, Atomic Kitten returned to the studio in the fall of 2001 to begin work on their second album. Once again, the group teamed up with OMD members and Atomic Kitten founders, Andy McCluskey and Stuart Kershaw, who wrote the majority of tracks on Right Now. The first recordings from the album were the songs "Walking on the Water", "The Moment You Leave Me", and "No One Loves You (Like I Love You)", all of which were featured on the album. The songwriting and production agreement with McCluskey and Kershaw was an increasing source of tension within the group, and the pair departed during the recording of the album. McCluskey spoke of dissension between himself and the record company, whose "formula" demanded "'Whole Again', 'Whole Again' and more fucking 'Whole Again'"; he was essentially dismissed and legally prohibited from contacting the band, before exiting the "very dirty" business of "manufactured pop".

After releasing a cover version of "Eternal Flame" on the previous album, Susanna Hoffs from The Bangles was asked to write a track for the album called "Love Doesn't Have to Hurt". The girls teamed up with Rob Davis for the songwriting and production of several songs and as a result, Kylie Minogue with whom he frequently collaborated, donated the song "Feels So Good" to the album. Out of gratitude and because they felt it was a great title, the group decided to name the album after that song. Minogue's vocals from the original demo remain on the final song.

Critical reception

AllMusic editor Andy Kellman found that Feels so Good was "nearly as solid as Right Now, with more playful chemistry evident between the three members.  Though the three biggest hits – "It's OK!," "The Last Goodbye," and a cover of Blondie's cover of "The Tide Is High" – are well-executed, easygoing pop songs, the group is at its best when it takes on the role of a modern disco act (as heard on "Feels So Good," "Love Won't Wait," and "Softer the Touch")." BBC writer Alun Williams called Feels so Good "one of the better CD's within the pop genre." He found that "there are a few gems amongst the numerous tracks," but also remarked that "the albums' production is at best unadventurous and at worst repetitive and very unoriginal."

Caroline Sullivan, writing for The Guardian, felt that "the album is mush of a mushness, weighted in favour of system-built uptempo tunes such as the title track, written for them by an apparently listless Kylie Minogue. At least these are marginally better than the ballads, sour little semi-acoustic snippets that sound like Westlife on oestrogen. What this album is crying out for is a kick in the tush from an avenging Kelly Osbourne." British music website Peter Robinson from NME called Feels So Good "a dated collection of by-numbers pop, rarely any more imaginative than their cover of Billie Piper's cover of Blondie's cover of "The Tide Is High." It gets worse: they even forced Kylie to soil her tiny hands, writing the title track." Entertainment.ie wrote that Feels So Goods "peculiarly watered-down brand of R'n'B is like the worst kind of fast food: uniform, tasteless, and forgotten the moment it's been consumed."

Track listing

Notes and sample credits
 denotes additional producer
 denotes vocal producer
 denotes co-producer

Charts

Weekly charts

Year-end charts

Certifications

References

External links

Best Kitten Food

2002 albums
Atomic Kitten albums
Albums produced by Stargate